The Tongyeong Undersea Tunnel is an undersea tunnel in South Korea that links the city of Tongyeong in Goseong County to  island. The tunnel is 5 m wide by 3.5 m high and 483 m long, and is 13.5 m below the sea surface at high tide. Completed in 1932 when Korea was under Japanese rule, it was the first undersea tunnel in Asia. Before the tunnel was built Mireukdo was a tidal island, accessible on foot at low tide. Originally built for motor vehicles, the tunnel is now only used by pedestrians.

References 

Tunnels completed in 1932
Undersea tunnels in Asia
Tongyeong
1932 establishments in Asia